The 1984 Little League World Series took place between August 21 and August 25 in Williamsport, Pennsylvania. The National Little League of Seoul, South Korea, defeated the National Little League of Altamonte Springs, Florida, in the championship game of the 38th Little League World Series.

Teams

Championship bracket

Position bracket

Notable players
 Jason Varitek (Altamonte Springs, Florida) – MLB catcher from 1997 to 2011

External links

Little League World Series
Little League World Series
Little League World Series